The heir apparent or heir presumptive to a Scottish peerage is known as a Master, or a Mistress if the heir is female. The heir's style is "The Master of [Peerage]" or "The Mistress of [Peerage]".

If the master is an heir apparent, and the peerage has a subsidiary title that could be used as a courtesy title, then the styling of Master is usually forgone. However, if the person is an heir presumptive, or if the peerage has no subsidiary title, then Master/Mistress is a common styling. However, because the word Mistress is quite archaic, many women choose not to use the style Mistress and instead use the regular styling, e.g. Lady Mary Smith or The Honourable Mary Smith.

Although regarded today as a form of courtesy title, the Mastership is a dignity in its own right, and originally conferred rights of attendance in the Parliament of Scotland. As noblemen, Masters were ineligible for election to the House of Commons of Great Britain for Scottish constituencies. Masters whose elections were declared void on this basis included four elected in the 1708 British general election, who each briefly attended parliament: Lord Johnstone (the Master of Annandale), Lord Haddo (the Master of Aberdeen), Lord Strathnaver (the Master of Sutherland) and the John, Master of Sinclair (never recognized as Lord Sinclair). Lord Elcho was excluded from Parliament in 1787 on the grounds that he had become the Master of Wemyss, though in fact the peerage was under forfeiture.

People who currently hold the dignity of Master or Mistress

 Lord Alistair Hay, Master of Tweeddale, heir presumptive to the Marquessate of Tweeddale
 Susan of Mar, Mistress of Mar, heiress presumptive to the Earldom of Mar
 Alexander David Erskine, Master of Mar and Kellie, heir presumptive to the Earldom of Mar and Kellie
 Geoffrey Charles Murray, Master of Dunmore, heir presumptive to the Earldom of Dunmore
 Alexander Cary, Master of Falkland, heir apparent to the Viscountcy of Falkland
 Christopher Keith Arbuthnott, Master of Arbuthnott, heir apparent to the Viscountcy of Arbuthnott
 Neil Malcolm Ross Forbes, Master of Forbes, heir apparent to the Lordship of Forbes
 Katharine Fraser, Mistress of Saltoun, heiress presumptive to the Lordship of Saltoun
 Jack Fraser, Master of Lovat, heir presumptive to the Lordship of Lovat
 Francis Sempill, Master of Sempill, heir apparent to the Lordship of Sempill
 Jago Alexander Elphinstone, Master of Elphinstone, heir presumptive to the Lordship of Elphinstone
 Laetitia Bruce-Winkler, Mistress of Burleigh, heiress presumptive to the Lordship of Balfour of Burleigh
 Lewis Edward Palmer, Master of Dingwall, heir apparent to the Lordship of Dingwall (also Great Britain Baron Lucas of Crudwell)
 William Alexander Hugh Napier, Master of Napier, heir apparent to the Lordship of Napier
 Alexander Shimi Markus Mackay, Master of Reay, heir apparent to the Lordship of Reay
 Frederick Carmichael Arthur Hamilton, Master of Belhaven, heir apparent to the Lordship of Belhaven and Stenton
 James David William Rollo, Master of Rollo, heir apparent to the Lordship of Rollo
 William Henry Hepburne-Scott, Master of Polwarth, heir apparent to the Lordship of Polwarth

References

Peerage of Scotland
Lists of Scottish people